Mercu Buana University (UMB, or Universitas Mercu Buana) is a private university is a private university under the Menara Bhakti Foundation located in Jakarta. Mercu Buana University is one of the best universities in Indonesia, which has a long history with a good reputation. This is evidenced by the ranking of Mercu Buana University at the national and international levels. Internationally, Mercu Buana University has been named Number One Private Higher Education based on the AD Index Scientific Ranking in 2022 and ranked 3rd Best Private University in DKI Jakarta from 4 International Colleges and Universities (UniRank) in 2022. Domestically, Mercu Buana University occupies the position of eleven nationally and number three in Jakarta based on the 2022 Webometric ranking. Meanwhile, according to the 2020 Indonesian Higher Education Clusterization by the Directorate General of Higher Education, Ministry of Education, Culture, Research and Technology of the Republic of Indonesia, Mercu Buana University is ranked 33 nationally (4 best private LLDIKTI Region 3 Jakarta). The four international and national accreditations are enough to prove that Mercu Buana University is a reputable campus

History

Founding and early history
With his background as a teacher at Taman Siswa, Pematang Siantar, North Sumatra, H. Probosutedjo established Akademi Wiraswasta Dewantara (Dewantara Entrepreneur Academy; AWD) on November 10, 1981. Its groundbreaking was conducted by H. Adam Malik, former Indonesian vice president. The name was taken from a national education figure: Ki Hajar Dewantara.

Before it had its own campus, lectures were given at Gedung Yayasan Tenaga Kerja Indonesia (the Building of Indonesian Migrant Workers’s Foundation – YTKI) on Jalan Gatot Soebroto. In 1984, Yayasan Menara Bhakti (Menara Bhakti Foundation) built the Menara Bhakti Campus.

In 1985 plans were made to erect a university-level institution. With a decree of the chairman of Menara Bhakti Foundation, they in 1985 formed a committee to establish a university. On the committee were chairman Dr. Sri-Edi Swasono assisted by H. Abdul Madjid, Dr. Iman Santosa Sukardi, Dr. M. Enoch Markum, Ir. Suharyadi, M.S., Soekarno and Prijo S. Parwoto.

Kopertis Region III (Responsible for Jadetabek region) granted an operational permit to Mercu Buana University. On October 22, 1985 Mercu Buana was officially declared as a university with faculties and departments as follows:
 Faculty of Engineering, with Architecture and Civil Engineering Departments
 Faculty of Agriculture, with Agribusiness and Agronomy Departments
 Economics, with Management and Accounting Departments

The number of students in the first year was 118. A year later, based upon assessment result conducted by Kopertis Region III, the six departments received “Registered” status from Minister of Education and Culture.

Identity

Organization and Governance

Rector
Dr. Harwikarya, MT is the caretaker rector of Mercu Buana University, pending the official result of rector selection.

Schools and colleges
UMB is organized into schools and colleges, each with a different dean and organization.

Faculties

 Mercu Buana College of Accounting
 Mercu Buana College of Enterprise Management
 Mercu Buana Faculty of Accounting
 Mercu Buana Faculty of Communication Studies
 Mercu Buana Faculty of Management
 Mercu Buana Faculty of Computer Science
 Mercu Buana Faculty of Architectural Engineering
 Mercu Buana Faculty of Industrial Engineering
 Mercu Buana Faculty of Electrochemical Technology
 Mercu Buana Faculty of Psychology

Postgraduate schools

 Mercu Buana School of Communication Studies
 Mercu Buana School of Management
 Mercu Buana School of Industrial Engineering
 Mercu Buana School of Telecommunication Engineering
 Mercu Buana School of Accounting

Facilities
Campuses
 Menara Bhakti Campus is on Jalan Meruya Selatan, Kebun Jeruk, West Jakarta.
 Menteng Campus is in Tedja Buana Building (Kedaung) 4th–6th floors on Jalan Menteng Raya No. 29, Central Jakarta.
 Warung Buncit A.K.A Pejaten Campus is on Jalan Warung Buncit Raya No. 98, South Jakarta.

Student Affairs

Notes

External links
 Official website
 Extension program

Universities in Jakarta
Private universities and colleges in Jakarta